Zhai Mo (born March 27, 1996 in Hebei) is a Chinese chess player. She was awarded the title Woman Grandmaster (WGM) by FIDE in 2016. Zhai competed in the Women's World Chess Championship in 2017 and 2018.

She won the Girls Under 12 event of the World Youth Chess Championships in 2008. Zhai won the Women's Chinese Chess Championship in 2018. Also in 2018, she was part of the Chinese team that took the gold medal in the women's section of the Asian Nations Cup and in the Women's Chess Olympiad.

References

External links 

1996 births
Living people
Chess woman grandmasters
Chinese female chess players
World Youth Chess Champions
Chess players from Hebei
Chess Olympiad competitors